Nandagopal, was an Indian film journalist, editor and critic. He was married to Kalpana Devi who is also of Repalle and the couple have three children- Nadella Gopichand, Nadella Pratyagatma and Koduru Kavitha.
As a prolific publisher, with more than forty years of experience. Nandagopal was involved in film journalism workshops, and was associated with L. V. Prasad, B.Nagi Reddy, and Aluri Chakrapani. He was even closely associated with N.T.R. during his political and film phase, where Nandagopal used to be beside him all the time. He was awarded two Nandi awards given by the State Government of Andhra Pradesh. He was even designated as the Censor Board Of India President for 12 years.

During the early phase of his career he was a member of NFDC, and CBFC. In 2013, he has garnered the National Film Award for Best Book on Cinema for his book on global cinema titled Cinema Ga Cinema at the 61st National Film Awards.

He died on 22 June 2018. He won two Nandi Awards.

Awards
National Film Awards
National Film Award for Best Book on Cinema (2013) - Cinema Ga Cinema

Nandi Awards
Best Book on Telugu Cinema - Cinema Ga Cinema (2013)
Best Film Critic on Telugu Cinema - 1995

Other honors
1997 Meghasandesam – Best Film Critic Award
2000 Dasari Narayana Rao gold medal - Best Film Journalist
2007 Twin Cities Telugu Cinema Diamond Jubilee Felicitation
2013 Senior Film Journalist Award - South Indian Film Chamber of Commerce

References

1934 births
2018 deaths
Indian male journalists
Indian film critics
Andhra University alumni
Journalists from Andhra Pradesh
People from Guntur district